Rapatee is an unincorporated community in Maquon Township, Knox County, Illinois, United States.

References

Unincorporated communities in Knox County, Illinois
Unincorporated communities in Illinois